Markus Mendler (born 7 January 1993) is a German professional footballer who plays as a midfielder for FC Homburg.

International career 
Mendler represented the German U20 national team on two occasions.

Honours
Individual
 Fritz Walter Medal U18 Bronze: 2011

References

External links 
 
 

1993 births
Living people
People from Memmingen
Sportspeople from Swabia (Bavaria)
German footballers
Footballers from Bavaria
Association football forwards
Germany youth international footballers
Bundesliga players
2. Bundesliga players
3. Liga players
Regionalliga players
1. FC Nürnberg players
1. FC Nürnberg II players
SV Sandhausen players
Stuttgarter Kickers players
1. FC Saarbrücken players
FC 08 Homburg players